The Archiepiscopal Palace of Alcalá de Henares (Spanish: Palacio Arzobispal de Alcalá de Henares) is a palace located in Alcalá de Henares, in the Community of Madrid, Spain. It is now home to the Diocese of Alcalá de Henares. It is located in the Plaza del Palacio and this form part of the monumental set declared World Heritage Site by UNESCO.

The building complex dates from 1209. Two thirds were destroyed in a devastating fire in 1939, during the Spanish Civil War. The part of the building which is preserved is what is left intact after the 1939 fire, the damaged parts were not restored.

In this building came to reside different Castilian monarchs, were held synods and councils, and in here were born the youngest daughter of the Catholic Monarchs and future queen of England, Catherine of Aragon, and the German Emperor Ferdinand, son of Joanna "the Mad". In addition, it is famous for being the place where the first meeting between the Catholic Monarchs and Christopher Columbus was held.

History 

First it was a Mudéjar fortress  commissioned in 1209 by Archbishop Rodrigo Ximénez de Rada (1209-1247), as a temporary residence of the archbishops of Toledo (Alcalá belonged to the archdiocese) and hence its name. It has suffered several fires and destructions, and has been remodeled several times to the present.

In the Archbishop's Palace were held the Courts in 1348 and was enacted the Ordinance of Alcalá, in that was unified the administration of justice to all the lands that formed the Crown of Castile.

In 1308 the kings Ferdinand IV of Castile and James II of Aragon met here to agree and sign the Treaty of Alcalá de Henares by which were distributed the territories obtained to al-Andalusian Taifas during the Reconquista.

Also in the 14th century, Archbishop Pedro Tenorio (1377-1399) rebuild the building fortifying it. He built a parade courtyard, rectangular, of more than 2 hectares. Surrounded by a walls with 21 towers; all rectangular less the albarrana of pentagonal, and the attached to it a semicircular plan. Currently are 16 towers, highlighting the "Tower of Tenorio" nominated in memory of the Archbishop.

In the 15th century, Archbishop Juan Martínez Contreras (1423-1434) build the east wing, decorated with large Gothic windows, the Anteroom and Hall of the Councils. The latter two were connected by a large túmido arc (in pointed horseshoe), and covered by a formidable Gothic-Mudéjar coffered ceiling.

On 20 January 1486, here was held the first interview between the queen Isabella I of Castile with Christopher Columbus to finance the trip to the Indies.

In 1524 Archbishop Alonso de Fonseca y Ulloa (1523-1534) commissioned to the architect Alonso de Covarrubias the construction of the west wing, with its courtyards and its magnificent staircase. His successor, Cardinal Juan Pardo de Tavera (1534-1545), finished the work.

Throughout its existence it housed in its inside the archives of the diocese of Toledo. Subsequently, its facilities were used for the custody of the Notary Clerks and the Judicial revenue. And from 1858 to 1939 was the Central General Archive of Alcalá de Henares.

Given the saturation of the Archivo de Simancas and its distance to the Court of Madrid, was determined the creation of the Central General Archive in 1858 in the Archbishop's Palace after its assignment to the State for this purpose by Archbishop Cirilo de Alameda y Brea (1857-1872). This Archive received documents from the ministries and agencies suppressed following the reform of 1834. After the regulatory deadlines it forwarded the documents to the National Historical Archive, until on August 12, 1939 a fire destroyed the Central General Archive. Its successor, from 1969 is General Archive of the Administration (AGA), also in Alcalá de Henares.

Currently, from 1991, it is the seat of Bishopric of Alcalá de Henares, and residence of the bishop.

Disastrous fire of 1939

The Archbishop's Palace was a barracks for tanks and ammunitions, both during and after the Civil War, when, for the failure to prevent flammable materials that were there, there was a big fire. It was not the first suffered in its long history, but one of the most voracious, because it destroyed much of the buildings and the documentation kept there for three centuries.

Among the artistic treasures that were lost in the Archbishop's Palace are: the Mudéjar coffered ceiling of the Hall of Councils, the monumental staircase of Covarrubias -author of the façade-, the courtyard of Fonseca, the courtyard of the Hallelujah, the facade of the courtyard of the Ave Maria, paintings, and the first archaeological museum of the city.

The building

The building has undergone numerous constructions and rehabilitations, being especially devastating the fire of August 11, 1939, which destroyed two thirds of its structure: three courtyards ("the Fonseca" or "the Covarrubias", "the Hallelujah" and the "of the Fountain" or the "Small garden"), the "Staircase of honor", the "Facade of the Ave Maria", which was of Herrerian style and the "Garden of the Vicar". A rehabilitation of the less damaged parts was completed in 1996 and was necessary.

Currently has 16 towers, highlighting the "Tower of Tenorio". Entering through the parade courtyard, appears the Renaissance main facade of the building. It is divided into two bodies, being the low of ashlar, with two floors of Plateresque windows that joins an upper gallery of gemanates arches. On the central window is a Baroque coat of terracotta, which replaced the imperial of Charles V, Holy Roman Emperor. The blazon is of the Cardinal-Infante Luis Antonio of Bourbon, son of Philip V, first Bourbon replacing the Habsburg dynasty. This courtyard is closed at south by a cast iron grille, made in Belgium in the 19th century.

In the east wing, where was the "Hall of Councils", was done in the 19th century a major restoration in its exterior and interior by Juan José Urquijo y Manuel Laredo, following the Neo-Mudéjar style. In 1997 was opened the restored neo-Gothic chapel that replaces the missing Hall of Councils. In the lower floor has made a modern auditorium, replacing the "Hall of the Queen Isabella".

Missing elements

Antiquarium museum
In the Archbishop's Palace it were again rebuilt several parties burned, others were restored, and still continue rescuing parts of those gems. Through the Tower XIV it can access the Antiquarium and visit some of those aforementioned remains, which have recreated partially the galleries of the Ave Maria, the large Courtyard of Fonseca and the Staircase of Covarrubias.

For decades held in Alcalá the representation outside of the play "Don Juan Tenorio" by Zorrilla, in several Alcalá's monuments, and one of it is always the Archbishop's Palace, even some year has staged exclusively there.

The Antiquarium is an outdoors museum placed in the inside of the walled enclosure and accessible through the fourteenth tower.

Toponymy
The Archbishop's Palace owes its name to that Alcalá de Henares for eight hundred years belonged to the jurisdiction of the archbishops of Toledo, who were also the primates -the most preeminents- of all Spain, and that here had their residence. This made that Alcalá de Henares was always at the center of religious power, which for centuries was also synonymous with the political.

Historical people

Monarchs that born, lived and died in the Archbishop's Palace
In the Archbishop's Palace, many members of the Court lived and died, including the Castilian King John I in 1390, after falling off his horse nearby. Other monarchs used it as a temporary residence, for example, the Catholic Monarchs; their daughter, Catherine of Aragon (who would be queen of England as wife of Henry VIII of England) was born there. Here in this Archbishop Palace too was born Ferdinand I, Holy Roman Emperor, son of Joanna the Mad and  Holy Roman Emperor as successor of Charles V, Holy Roman Emperor (I of Spain).

Others who died in the Archbishop's Palace
 Jimeno Martínez de Luna (¿? - 1338): Archbishop.
 Sancho de Rojas (1372 - 1422): Archbishop and militar.
 Juan Martínez de Contreras (¿? - 1434): Archbishop and lawyer.
 Alfonso Carrillo de Acuña (1410 - 1482): Archbishop.
 Alonso III Fonseca (1475 - 1534): Archbishop.
 García Loaysa y Girón (1534 - 1599): Archbishop and writer.

Archbishop's Palace of Alcalá de Henares in audiovisual media 
In its facilities partially or totally recorded several film productions:

Movies 

 1918:	Los intereses creados by Jacinto Benavente and Ricardo Puga
 1928: El guerrillero by José Buchs
 1931: Isabel de Solís, reina de Granada by José Buchs
 1934:	El agua en el suelo by Eusebio Fernández Ardavín
 1943:	El escándalo by José Luis Sáenz de Heredia
 1960:	La rana verde by José María Forn
 1967:	Sor Citroen by Pedro Lazaga
 1972:	Carta de amor de un asesino by Francisco Regueiro
 1972: ¡Qué nos importa la revolución! by Sergio Corbucci
 1973: Lo verde empieza en los Pirineos by Vicente Escrivá
 1974: Una pareja... distinta by José María Forqué
 1977: Paraíso by Miguel Luxemburgo (José Miguel Ganga) 
 1986: Dragón Rapide by Jaime Camino

Documentaries 

 1935: Alcalá de Henares by Daniel Jorro
 1943: Alcalá de Henares by Francisco Mora
 1946:	Alcalá, la cervantina by Juan A. Durán
 1946:	Compluto Alcalá de Henares by Luis Meléndez Galán
 1970: Alcalá de Cervantes by Raúl Peña Nalda
 1971: Ruta colombina by Augusto Fenollar
 1992: Sueños de fortuna by Pedro Martínez Oses
 2013: El Palacio de los Arzobispos de Toledo en Alcalá de Henares by Gustavo Chamorro Merino and Ángel Pérez López

References

External links 

 Bishopric of Alcalá de Henares 
 Virtual tour through a reconstruction of the Archbishop's Palace of Alcalá de Henares (video with a defect, it shows the Tower of Tenorio without its spire and neither the clock of the palace that placed on the spire)
 "Adventures and misadventures of the Archbishop's Palace of Alcalá de Henares", Research work "a Senior University Diploma" from Jaume I University (written in Spanish)

Religious buildings and structures completed in 1209
Palaces in the Community of Madrid
Buildings and structures in Alcalá de Henares
Mudéjar architecture in the Community of Madrid
Gothic architecture in the Community of Madrid
Bien de Interés Cultural landmarks in the Community of Madrid
Episcopal palaces
Catherine of Aragon